Gino De Keersmaeker is an athlete and Paralympian from Belgium competing mainly in category F42 discus throw and shot put events. He competed in all 6 Paralympic Games between 1992 and 2012, winning a gold medal in 1996 and silver medals in 2000 and 2004.

Results
1992 
Men's Shot Put THS2: 13th
Men's Discus Throw THS2: 11th
1996 
Men's Shot Put F42: 5th
Men's Discus Throw F42: 1st
2000 
Men's Shot Put F42: 4th
Men's Discus Throw F42: 2nd
2004 
Men's Shot Put F42: 6th
Men's Discus Throw F42: 2nd
2008 
Men's Shot Put F42: 12th
Men's Discus Throw F42: 5th
2012 
Men's Discus Throw F42: 6th

References

External links
 

Paralympic athletes of Belgium
Athletes (track and field) at the 1992 Summer Paralympics
Athletes (track and field) at the 1996 Summer Paralympics
Athletes (track and field) at the 2000 Summer Paralympics
Athletes (track and field) at the 2004 Summer Paralympics
Athletes (track and field) at the 2008 Summer Paralympics
Athletes (track and field) at the 2012 Summer Paralympics
Paralympic gold medalists for Belgium
Paralympic silver medalists for Belgium
Medalists at the 1996 Summer Paralympics
Medalists at the 2000 Summer Paralympics
Medalists at the 2004 Summer Paralympics
Year of birth missing (living people)
Living people
People from Zwijndrecht (Belgium)
Paralympic medalists in athletics (track and field)
Belgian male discus throwers
Belgian male shot putters
Sportspeople from Antwerp Province
Discus throwers with limb difference
Shot putters with limb difference
Paralympic discus throwers
Paralympic shot putters